Ninja Gaiden: Dragon Sword is a 2008 action-adventure video game released for the Nintendo DS, developed by Team Ninja and published by Tecmo (in Europe it was published by Ubisoft). A main installment in the Ninja Gaiden series, it features Ryu Hayabusa as the protagonist. The game is the first portable video game title in the series to be developed by Team Ninja and the first game developed by this company to be released for the Nintendo system. Dragon Sword is set between Ninja Gaiden and Ninja Gaiden II.

This title is presented in a third person, pseudo-3D manner, meaning all the game-models are rendered in full 3D, but the world the player travels around in is pre-rendered. When played, the Nintendo DS is held sideways, as in Hotel Dusk: Room 215 and Brain Age: Train Your Brain in Minutes a Day!. The left screen shows the area map, while the right displays the main gameplay, when set for right-handed play, and reverse when set for left-handed play.

Set six months after Ninja Gaiden, Ryu Hayabusa has rebuilt the Hayabusa Village. When fellow villager and kunoichi, Momiji, is kidnapped by the Black Spider Ninja Clan, he is forced to find her, while uncovering the secrets behind the mysterious Dark Dragonstones and their relation to the Dragon Lineage.

Gameplay

The game's system heavily depends on the stylus, similar to The Legend of Zelda: Phantom Hourglass. For example:
By tapping the screen, Ryu will use his currently selected projectile.;
By tapping and holding, Ryu will run to the desired location;
By drawing a horizontal or vertical line on an enemy, Ryu will do a horizontal or vertical slash with his sword;
And by sliding up on the screen, Ryu will jump.

Use of Ryu's Ninpo will be activated by tapping an icon on the touch screen. This brings up the outline of a Sanskrit letter to be traced with the stylus. Successfully tracing the letter will activate the appropriate magic.

Like Ninja Gaiden, Ryu can also block attacks by pressing any of the buttons or the directional pad. Evasive rolls can be performed by entering into a blocking stance and tapping the stylus. Although he does not have a multitude of weapons like before, he can still perform his signature Izuna Drop and absorb nearby essences, given off by slain enemies, to unleash powerful attacks, known as Ultimate Techniques. This can be done by sliding the stylus back and forth on Ryu.

A playable demo of the game is downloadable from the DS Download Station Volume 7 and was previously available from the Wii's Nintendo Channel.

Plot
Six months after the events of Ninja Gaiden (chronicled as the Dark Dragon Blade Incident), Ryu Hayabusa has rebuilt the Hayabusa Village. After a training session with the up-and-coming kunoichi, Momiji, she is kidnapped by members of the Black Spider Ninja Clan, on orders from their leader, Obaba, who hopes to obtain the Eye of the Dragon for the ancient Fiend, Ishtaros. As Ryu desperately searches for her, he is suddenly transported back to the monastery in Tairon, capital city of the Holy Vigoor Empire, where he faces hordes of Fiends in the vicinity. After finding a peculiar object, he returns to his village, where master swordsmith, Muramasa, informs him it is a Dark Dragonstone, containing the will and essence of a Dark Dragon. If all eight stones were gathered, it would unleash a power much greater than the Dark Dragon Blade. Muramasa feels confident Ryu will manage to find all eight, thus the young ninja heads to seek out the rest of the stones.

Once Ryu finds seven Dark Dragonstones, the stones lead him to the Black Spider's hideout. There, he finds Obaba, now transformed into a Fiend, and defeats her. The stones reveal a portal down to the Underworld, where Ishtaros awaits the ninja at the Gates of Hell, with an unconscious Momiji as her hostage. The Fiend steals the seven Dragonstones and the eighth is revealed to be in Ishtaros' possession: the jewel embedded into her crown. Ishtaros goes on the offensive, stating since she has control of all eight stones and the Dragon Sword's power is nothing without the Eye of the Dragon, Ryu cannot defeat her. Suddenly, the spirit of the deceased shrine maiden, Kureha, appears and draws out Momiji's spirit. Together, they release the Eye of the Dragon, which fuses with the Dragon Sword, becoming the True Dragon Sword for a second time. Ryu easily defeats Ishtaros, until Nicchae, her twin sister, appears and takes Ishtaros' body and the stones deeper into Hell, to resurrect the Holy Vigoor Emperor.

Unfortunately, the will of the Dark Dragon embedded in the stones is too strong for the Fiends to handle, thus destroying the symbolic Emperor, before it can fully resurrect, and encases Ishtaros in a cocoon. Resigned to her fate that a Dark Dragon will rise again, Nicchae engages Ryu. He mortally wounds her, and as the cocoon absorbs Nicchae, a Dark Dragon bursts out of the shell. Ryu is forced to slay the beast and bring an end to the destruction it could bring. The battle over, Momiji mysteriously appears at Ryu's feet and is unharmed. They return to the Hayabusa Village and after Momiji visits Kureha's grave, promising she will become stronger to better protect herself and the Eye of the Dragon, joins Ryu to continue her training.

Development
Ninja Gaiden series director Tomonobu Itagaki has stated that he decided to make the game for the Nintendo DS because of the originality that the platform allows, which he feels is the most important aspect of a handheld platform, and also to create a challenge for himself. Itagaki also claimed that his children wanted one of his titles on the platform.

One of Itagaki's goals with Ninja Gaiden DS is to create a game that can be played by all gamers everywhere, saying that his other titles "have traditionally targeted men above the age 18 and Westerners." An example of this is that the characters that are traced to perform ninpo magic, were originally kanji; this was changed to the more "culture-neutral" Sanskrit to make things fairer for non-Japanese audiences. Another is the removal of graphic violence common in the Ninja Gaiden prequel series to receive a lower ESRB rating.

The English localization was overseen by Team Ninja member Andrew Szymanski, in collaboration with AltJapan Co., Ltd.

Reception

Ninja Gaiden Dragon Sword has received generally positive reviews. Aggregator website GameRankings received an average score of 82.80% based on 53 reviews while Metacritic received an average score of 83/100. Reviewers praised the good visuals and intuitive controls, but a common point of criticism was its short length, six to seven hours, and lack of the difficulty compared to previous games in the Ninja Gaiden series.

Ninja Gaiden Dragon Sword was named by IGN.com as the best Nintendo DS action game of 2008, also awarding it as having the best graphics technology for the Nintendo DS. It was also nominated for the best Nintendo DS game of 2008 award and was nominated for the award for the best original score on the Nintendo DS in 2008. It was also awarded Best Use of Control Scheme by GameSpot in their 2008 Special Achievements video game awards, and nominated for Nintendo DS Game of the Year as well. N-Europe gave the game 9/10, citing "flawless presentation" and an excellent control scheme.

References

External links
 

2008 video games
Ninja Gaiden games
Nintendo DS games
Action-adventure games
Nintendo DS-only games
Single-player video games
Tecmo games
Team Ninja games
Ubisoft games
Video game sequels
Video games developed in Japan
Video games featuring female protagonists
Video games set in Japan
Video games set in the 21st century